USS Gwinnett (AK-185/AG-92/AVS-5) was originally an  acquired by the U.S. Navy shortly before the end of World War II and converted into a . She was found to be excess-to-needs and was placed into reserve in 1946.

Constructed
Gwinnett was originally designated AK-185 and was launched as AG-92 under U.S. Maritime Commission contract, MC hull 2116, by Walter Butler Shipbuilders, Inc., Superior, Wisconsin, 14 May 1944; sponsored by Mrs. Oliva Dionne, mother of the Dionne quintuplets. After being taken down the Mississippi River to New Orleans, Louisiana, the ship was outfitted at Port Houston Iron Works, Houston, Texas, and commissioned there 10 April 1945.

Service history

World War II-related service
Soon after commissioning, Gwinnett was redesigned AVS-5 on 25 May 1945. After shakedown in the Gulf of Mexico she was ordered to the Pacific coast for disposal.

Inactivation
Gwinnett arrived San Francisco, 25 January 1946. She decommissioned and was simultaneously redelivered to the U.S. Maritime Commission 11 February 1946.

Merchant service
Gwinnett was initially leased to the General Steamship Corporation, on 11 July 1947, but then sold to the Republic of France on 14 August 1947. She was reflagged for France and renamed Sainte Helene. She was scrapped in January 1970.

Notes 

Citations

Bibliography 

Online resources

External links

 

Alamosa-class cargo ships
Gwinnett County, Georgia
Ships built in Superior, Wisconsin
1944 ships
World War II auxiliary ships of the United States
Gwinnett-class aviation stores issue ships